Epermenia pumila is a moth of the  family Epermeniidae. It is found in France.

References

Moths described in 2000
Epermeniidae
Moths of Europe